Bleasdale is an English toponymic surname. Notable people with this name include:

 Alan Bleasdale
 Gary Bleasdale

 Holly Bleasdale
Ian Bleasdale
John Bleasdale
 Julia Bleasdale
Marcus Bleasdale
 Steve Bleasdale
Tony Bleasdale
 Angela Bleasdale

See also 
 

English toponymic surnames